Miss Brazil World 2015 was the 26th edition of the Miss Brazil World pageant and 10th under MMB Productions & Events. During this pageant MMB Productions & Events became CNB Miss Brazil, thus this is the 1st under CNB Miss Brazil. The contest took place on June 27, 2015. Each state, the Federal District and various Insular Regions & Cities competed for the title. Julia Gama of Rio Grande do Sul originally crowned Ana Luísa Castro of Sergipe at the end of the contest but Castro resigned the title after the contest due to having an unrecognized marriage outside of Brazil in Belgium and wanting to get her marriage recognized in Brazil. As a result, Catharina Choi of Ilhabela was crowned as the Miss Brazil World 2015 by Castro. Choi represented Brazil at Miss World 2015. The contest was held at the Pedro Ivo Theater in Florianópolis, Santa Catarina, Brazil.

Results

Regional Queens of Beauty

Special Awards

Challenge Events

Beauty with a Purpose

Beauty & Personality

Best in Interview

Evening Fashion

Miss Talent

Miss Top Model

Multimedia

Sports

Delegates
The delegates for Miss Brazil World 2015 were:

States

 - Janyele Santos
 - Jade Vale Davis
 - Mayra Dias
 - Monique Morais
 - Maria Theresa Carvalho
 - Thainá Magalhães
 - Nathalia Kaur
 - Monalisa Carneiro
 - Paula Gomes
 - Júlia Horta
 - Mara Ângela Lima
 - Mariana Souto
 - Annie Spina
 - Miriam Silva
 - Maria Cândido
 - Viviane Soares
 - Mariana Moura
 - Laís Berté
 - Rebeca Falco
 - Clóris Junges
 - Kelly Medeiros
 - Ana Luísa Castro
 - Jaqueline Verrel

Insular Regions and Cities

 Baixada Fluminense - Bárbara Suter
 Fernando de Noronha - Brenda Arruda
 Ilhabela - Catharina Choi
 Ilha do Marajó - Nathália Lago
 Ilha de Santana - Lycia Ribeiro
 Ilha do Mel - Ana Agostini
 Ilha do Mosqueiro - Clícia Pinheiro
 Ilha dos Lobos - Jéssica Lírio
 Ilha dos Marinheiros - Valleska Magri
 Jurerê Internacional - Juliana Policastro
 Pampa Gaúcho - Andrieli Rozin
 São Paulo Capital - Marjorie Rossi
 Trindade e Martim Vaz - Larissa Dienstmann

Notes

Withdrawals
 Greater Florianópolis - Ellen Teodoro; Withdrew the day before the finals were held citing health problems as the cause.

Did not compete

References

External links
 Official site (in Portuguese)

2015
2015 in Brazil
2015 beauty pageants
Beauty pageants in Brazil